This is a list of the first minority male lawyers and judges in Mississippi, United States. It includes the year in which the men were admitted to practice law (in parentheses). Also included are men who achieved other distinctions such becoming the first in their state to graduate from law school or become a political figure.

Firsts in state history

Lawyer 

 James Henry Piles (1869): First African-American male lawyer in Mississippi

State judges 

John R. Lynch: First African American male to serve as a judicial officer in Mississippi (1869)
Reuben V. Anderson (1967): First African-American male to serve as a judge since Reconstruction in Mississippi (1977) and on the Mississippi Supreme Court (1985)

Federal judges 
 Halil Suleyman Ozerden: First Turkish American male to serve on the United States District Court for the Southern District of Mississippi (2007)

James E. Graves Jr. (1980): First African-American male to serve on the U.S. Court of Appeals for the Fifth Circuit in Mississippi (2011)

United States Attorney 

 Tyree Irving: First African American male to serve as the U.S. Attorney for Mississippi (1978) [Northern District of Mississippi]

District Attorney 

 Willis E. Mollison (1887): First African American male to serve as a District Attorney in Mississippi (1893)

Assistant District Attorney 

 Clell Ward: First African American to serve as an Assistant District Attorney in Mississippi (1975)

Bar Association 

Reuben V. Anderson (1967): First African American male to serve as the President of the Mississippi Bar Association

Firsts in local history 
 Scott Colom: First African American male to serve as the district attorney for a majority-white district in Mississippi (2015). He was the first African American to serve as the prosecutor for Columbus, Mississippi. He was also the African American male judge in Lowndes County, Mississippi (2011) and a municipal court judge in Aberdeen, Mississippi (2012) [Monroe County, Mississippi].
 Reuben V. Anderson (1967): First African-American male judge in Hinds County, Mississippi (1977)
 Louis Westerfield: First African American male to serve as the Dean of University of Mississippi School of Law (1994) [Lafayette County, Mississippi]

 Rickey Thompson: First African American male judge in Lee County, Mississippi
 Rod Hickman: First African American male to serve as the County Attorney of Noxubee County, Mississippi (2019)

 John Wilchie: First African American male to serve as a Justice Court Judge in Tallahatchie County, Mississippi

 Clell Ward: First African American to serve as the Assistant District Attorney of Washington County, Mississippi (1975)

See also 

 List of first minority male lawyers and judges in the United States

Other topics of interest 

 List of first women lawyers and judges in the United States
 List of first women lawyers and judges in Mississippi

References 

 
Minority, Mississippi, first
Minority, Mississippi, first
Lists of people from Mississippi
Legal history of Mississippi
Mississippi lawyers